The American technology company Google has added Easter eggs into many of its products and services, such as Google Search, YouTube, and Android since at least 2000.

Easter eggs are hidden features or messages, inside jokes, and cultural references inserted into media. They are often well hidden, so that users find it gratifying when they discover them, helping form bonds between their creators and finders. Google's employees are encouraged to use 20% of their time for projects of personal interest, and Easter eggs are sometimes created during this. Google avoids adding Easter eggs to popular search pages, as they do not want to negatively impact usability.

Google Search 

As Google searches are case insensitive, search terms are listed in lower case except where case sensitivity is explicitly referenced.

General
A Google web search for:

 "baby yoda", "grogu", "the child " or "the mandalorian" will bring up a Grogu (baby yoda) image button on the bottom right corner of the screen; when pressed, Grogu will use the force to pull off a result and throw it to the bottom of the screen. It is possible to press the button multiple times to remove more results. 
 "the last of us" or "cordyceps" will bring up a red mushroom button; when pressed, cordyceps will appear on the screen. It is possible to press the button several times to multiply the mushrooms. 
  2022 FIFA World Cup or World Cup 2022, will make a bunch of Argentina flags because Argentina won the world cup.
 "2/22/22" or "Twosday" would make confetti appear with number 2's and a phrase saying "Happy Twosday 2You!" on February 22, 2022.
 "a long time ago in a galaxy far far away" resulted in the same tilted, scrolling style that the introductions to the original Star Wars movies were presented in. This included the music, which was muted but could be heard by clicking on or selecting the muted speaker icon on the page. However, this was discontinued on June 28, 2017.
 "ascii art" showed the logo as if it was created with ASCII characters. This has been discontinued.
 "" causes the results page to be slightly tilted to the right. This effect once worked for the Google search of "tilt", but was discontinued.
 "binary", "hex", "hexadecimal" and "octal" showed the number of search results in the respective numeral system. This has been discontinued.
 "", "blink tag", or "blink html" includes samples of the blink element in the results.
 "" adds a glittering microphone next to the link to the official music video. Click it through each stage, and it will recreate the main chorus in the browser.
"chicxulub" or "meteorite" will show an asteroid falling on the results page. Then, the whole page will shake slightly.
 "christmas" changes the "Goooo...gle" page indicator at the bottom of every result page to show Christmas bulbs instead of o's.
 "christmas", "hanukkah", and "kwanzaa" will show decorations next to the search bar for each respective holiday. The feature used to be only active during the month of December. Each year, new decorations are shown.
 "" on a desktop browser generates a running configuration of the game to the right of the search results. The process can also be stopped and altered by the user.
 "" will show a grey tiger head, clicking the grey tiger head will play an animation of a person tripping over a tiger carpet.
 "diwali" will show a lamp which when clicked starts a lamp lighting game.
 "" or "z or r twice" causes the result page to do a Star Fox-style barrel roll.
 "drag queen", "gay pride", "homosexuality", "stonewall" and other LGBTQ+-related searches, at times of gay pride festival activity, cause the results page to have a rainbow themed header.
 "" will show a sign that when clicked will cause a Koala bear to drop
 "" causes the Google logo on the top left corner of the screen to bounce around the screen, shifting colors between blue, red, yellow, and green every time it hits the page boundaries.
 Every time the tab currently engaged in the Easter egg is returned to after being clicked out of, the bouncing logo will always be in a position where it hits perfectly into a corner.
 This feature is disabled if a major google doodle is occurring instead of the normal google logo.
 "" changes the "Goooo...gle" page indicator at the bottom of every result page to show Easter eggs instead of o's.
 "" shows an image of the Festivus pole beside the search results and the message "A festivus miracle!" next to the number of search results.
 "fifa" and "world cup", during FIFA World Cup 2010, caused the "Goooo...gle" page indicator at the bottom of every result page to read "Goooo...al!" instead. 
 "", "fourth of july" and other search terms containing "firework", on US Independence Day – July 4th, will display simulated multi-colored fireworks for several seconds.
 "Friends " and one of the main characters (Phoebe, Chandler, Ross, Monica, or Joey) will show an interactable icon respectively
 "" on a desktop browser will generate a layout similar to the one Google used for its search engine in 1998.
 "" will cause a pair of googly eyes to slide from the top of the page to cover each letter "O" in the top Google logo. The eyes will slowly follow the location of the user's cursor. 
 The same googly eyes appear when actors from Everything Everywhere All at Once are Googled (e.g. "michelle yeoh", "ke huy quan", "stephanie hsu"), in reference to the movie.
 "hanukkah" changes the "Goooo...gle" page indicator at the bottom of every result page to show Hanukkah cakes instead of o's.
 "heartstopper" will cause a trio of animated leaves to glide across the page.
 "ipl" will display yellow and blue fireworks in celebration of Chennai Super Kings victory over Kolkata Knight Riders during the 2021 Indian Premier League (no longer works as of October 30, 2021).
 "" returns with "No"
 "" will add spaces between the letters of the word "kerning" in the search results. Kerning refers to the process of adjusting the space between letters in a word.
 "" will remove spaces between the letters of the word "keming". This refers to improper kerning, particularly when not enough space is used between letters, which can cause mistakes like "kerning" to be read as "keming".
 "lunar new year", "chinese new year", or "year of the rabbit" caused fireworks to shoot up in the search page. Occasionally, a firework formed a rabbit silhouette. This was to celebrate the Year of the Rabbit in Lunar New Year in 2023. This has been removed recently. 
 "", "marquee tag", or "marquee html" will apply the marquee element to the results count at the top of the results.
 "memorial day" on Memorial Day will start a sequence saying "For all who sacrificed" and "Thank you" with poppies at the bottom.
 "" and vice versa showed the Double Asteroid Redirection Test satellite crashing and making the screen tilted. This was discontinued on February 22, 2023 for these specific terms, but similar terms such as "dart mission" and "double asteroid redirection test" still show the animation.
 "" will show a party popper near the top of the search page. Clicking it will cause confetti to appear. This easter egg also works with other years replacing 2023 (i.e. "new year's eve 2019"). 
 "", or "Pelé" causes the Goooo...gle page indicator at the bottom of the page to read Gooo..al instead, with the last "o" replaced by a soccer ball. If you click this soccer ball, or the #10 under it, then it will play an animation where the a is kicking the soccer ball, and the 'G' kicks it into the 'l', which has turned into a soccer goal. This Easter egg was made to honor the 80th birthday of the late soccer player Pelé.
 "" (or "" and pressing P on the keyboard) and clicking the "π" symbol will start a memory game similar to Simon, in which the calculator highlights the digits of pi and prompts the user to repeat the sequence. The sequence gets longer every turn. The high-score can be stored but will reset after reloading the page.
 "", "puppies", "dog" or "canine" will result in a button appearing in the panel that, when clicked, will cause any following clicks to bring a dog leg out and place a paw print at the mouse position, with a bark sound played.
 "qibla" and "eid al fitr"(or "eid'l fitr" and "eid al-fitr") will cause the "Goooo...gle" page indicator at the bottom of every result page to show nine cups and a pitcher instead.
 "" during the month of Ramadan will allow the initiation of a search of an image of a night sky for a crescent Moon by clicking an image of a crescent Moon in the Knowledge Panel. Upon finding the crescent Moon, the user is congratulated with the message "You found it! Ramadan Kareem to you and your loved ones!" as lanterns drop into view. This also worked during Eid al-Fitr month, but the message at the end was changed to "You found it! Eid Mubarak to you and your loved ones!"
 "RRR" ("") shows an emoji of a horse rider and a person biking emoji, referencing the characters of Alluri Sitarama Raju and Komaram Bheem from the 2022 Indian film.
 "star wars" and other Star Wars related search terms on May 4 (Star Wars Day) summons a splash of confetti, some confetti being characters/items from the Star Wars series.
 "suez canal" or "ever given" showed an emoji of a boat scrolling across the top of the screen, referencing the ending of the 2021 Suez canal obstruction.
 "" around the time of the Super Bowl will show a Knowledge Graph for the Super Bowl, along with a games' information panel titled "Superb Owl" with an image of an owl wearing a crown, in response to an ongoing joke amongst redditors about the common misspelling of "Super Bowl".
 "Super bowl" will show a black and red firework display in celebration of Kansas City Chiefs victory over Philadelphia Eagles.  On February 2021 the fireworks celebrated the Tampa Bay Buccaneers victory over Kansas City Chiefs.
 "" using most popular modern browsers (except Safari) and opening the browser's developer console will trigger a text-based adventure game playable within the console. Responding "no" to "would you like to play a game" will print "the only winning move is not to play" in the console, referencing WarGames.
 "" will show confetti along with pride and lesbian flags. This was added after Velma was confirmed to be a lesbian.
 "" turns the Google logo into moving colored blocks. This is a reference to an automated YouTube channel made by Google to test YouTube's performance. This does not work on mobile devices or when there is a Google Doodle on that day.
 "" will turn the Google logo into a round of Wordle and guess the words COLUMN, GOALIE, and GOOGLE.
 "" used to cause an army of Google Os to attack and destroy the search results, which could be defeated by clicking on them. Once you got defeated (as victory is impossible), the Os form two Gs (GG), meaning "Good Game". This easter egg is discontinued.
  Searching something which does not match (such as random nonsense text or special Unicode characters) any documents shows a cartoonish fisherman trying to catch a fish in somewhere with ice. Clicking on the fisherman will play an animation of the fisherman catching a random object (e.g., a fish, a can of fish, a boot, and a bent can) in a hole, and then tossing it in a bucket. The boot and the bent can will result in the fisherman becoming sad, and the fish and the can of fish will make him smile.
 "toni stone" on February 9 will have a splash of confetti.
 Searching any ongoing major tennis tournament (with men's singles and doubles, women's singles and doubles, and mixed doubles) will result in a Pong-like mini-game available by scrolling to the right of the scores. This mini-game is also available for past tennis tournaments by searching for the name of the tournament and the year in which the tournament was held.
"International Women's Day" on March 8, 2023, will show a parade of blue flags and confetti, celebrating the holiday

Did you mean
A Google web search for:
 "alex trebek" shows "Did you mean: who is alex trebek" in reference to Jeopardy!'''s rule of answers being in the form of a question.
 "" shows "Did you mean: assistant to the regional manager", referencing The Office.
 "" shows "Did you mean: nag a ram".
 "" shows "Did you mean: nerd fame again".
 "anagram" and "define anagram" also work in other languages. For example, a Google ES search for "" shows ".
"" shows "Did you mean: we don't talk about bruno", referencing the song from the movie Encanto.
 "" shows "Did you mean: vi", and vice versa when searching "". This is a reference to the vi vs Emacs editor war.
 "" shows "Did you mean: greedo shot first" and vice versa, referencing the infamous change made to Star Wars in 1997.
 "" shows "Did you mean: amelia mignonette thermopolis renaldi princess of genovia", referencing the protagonist in the film The Princess Diaries.
 ”olivia newton john” shows “Did you mean: the one that i want” referencing the song of the same name.
 "" shows a "Did you mean: recursion", linking to the same search over and over again.
 "" shows "Did you mean: groundhog day", linking to the same search over and over again, referencing the recursion present in the film of the same name. 
 "" shows "Did you mean: steamed clams", referencing The Simpsons episode "22 Short Films About Springfield".
 "" shows "Did you mean: my precioussss" in reference to Gollum's name for it in The Lord of the Rings.
 "" shows "Did you mean: THERE IS NO War in Ba Sing Se". This is a reference to the show Avatar: The Last Airbender, in which characters try to prevent the rumors of war.
 "" shows "Did you mean: Michael Scott", referencing The Office.
 "" shows "Did you mean: i am in great pain please help me", referencing the adult animated science fiction sitcom Rick and Morty. When using Google Assistant, it responds with "Are you in pain? How can I help?", "Sorry, I don't speak Birdperson" or "Morty, let's get Schwifty".

Knowledge Graph

A Google web search for:
 "" shows the name of the attraction being decoded in the Knowledge Graph.
 "" shows a purple heart with a microphone inside it, which when clicked will make purple balloons fly along with heart-shaped ones. When any of the heart-shaped balloons are clicked, a message from one of the members of BTS will show up along with that respective member saying "I purple you." and a different colored microphone for each one; sky blue for RM, pink for Jin, black for Suga, silver for J-Hope, gold for Jimin, green for V, and violet for Jungkook.
 "" will show a button with a paw print on it. Clicking it will cause cat arms to appear and leave paw prints wherever clicked, with meowing sound effects.
 "" or “sakura” will show a pink flower, which when clicked will show petals falling down.
 "" will show sliding taco, ice cream, and gravestone emojis and the date 1983-2022, referring to the start and end of the choco taco production.
 "" will show a bee flying across Earth, which when clicked will start a doodle that Google made in 2020 to celebrate Earth Day's 50th anniversary.
 "", in celebration of the 30th anniversary of the TV show's first airing in 1990, displayed a replica of the "FRESH" license plate in the Knowledge Graph. Clicking on the license plate caused a taxi to move by the screen, and the search results to acquire a 90s theme with various references to and jokes in reference to people and places across the TV show via audio clips and animations. Clicking the bar at the top of the page/the “freeeeeeeeeeesh” at the bottom reverted the display to its original results and design.
 "" in 2021 will show an LGBTQ heart, which when clicked will rain confetti and flags across the search results.
 "gay pride" in 2022 will still show the heart, but by clicking it, there's an animation at the bottom with raining confetti.
"gotham city", "batman", or "bruce wayne" will show the Bat-Signal next to the results. Tapping or clicking on the bat-signal shows a stormy night background on the search results page, along with the glowing bat signal overlayed on top. After a few seconds, you will hear a grappling sound before you see the shadow of Batman swinging across the screen. This in celebration of the release of The Batman.
 "holi" shows a picture of bowls of colored powder in the Knowledge Graph which, when clicked, will simulate throwing a gob of powder at the page where clicked. Further clicks on the page will simulate further gobs of colored powder being thrown to that point. A raindrop icon appears which, when clicked, will cause the page to be washed clean of colored powder. Also note that Goo...gle in the end of the page will show bowls of colored powder instead of letter o's.
 "" will show a button, clicking on it will display an animation at the bottom and also raining red, black and green confetti.
 "legally blonde" shows a pink purse next to the Knowledge Graph, which when clicked, has protagonist Elle Woods' pet chihuahua Bruiser jump out of the purse and walk to a pink salon chair which dresses him in his "signature sweater". He then walks back and jumps into the purse, with Elle saying, "Hi, I'm Elle Woods, and this is Bruiser Woods, and we're both Gemini vegetarians." Once the animation is complete, the color of the links on the page change from their usual blue to pink to match Elle's "signature look".
 "", "perseverance rover", or "ingenuity" will show the Ingenuity helicopter that when clicked, flies around the screen.
 "new year's eve" or ''new year's day'', New Year's Eve 2020, showed a cannon next to the Knowledge Graph which once clicked, made confetti explode.
 " planet" describes Pluto as "Our favorite dwarf planet since 2006" in the Knowledge Graph.
 "", "green hill zone" and ''sonic'' will give a Knowledge Graph with Sonic waiting. Clicking or tapping Sonic will make him spin; if clicked or tapped 25 times, Sonic will transform into Super Sonic.
 "", "splatoon 2", or "splatoon 3" will display colorful splat blobs in the Knowledge Graph. Clicking on it allows you to splat blobs of ink on the screen in the colors of Google's logo. Some splats have eyes in them, or shaped like squids and octopuses.
 "" shows a Knowledge Graph for Super Mario Bros. that contains a flashing "?" block which generates a coin and 200 points when clicked. After 100 coins are collected, the "1UP" sound plays. This was also added when the user searches for the Super Mario Bros. Movie near the film's theatrical release.
 "thanos" and "infinity gauntlet" displayed a Knowledge Graph with the Infinity Gauntlet on it. Clicking it will cause its fingers to snap, disintegrating half of the links and images on the page, as well as counting down the number of results to half. This is a reference to the 2018 film Avengers: Infinity War, in which the character Thanos destroyed half of all life in the universe with the Gauntlet on his hand by snapping his fingers. It was added in celebration of its sequel, Avengers: Endgame. Clicking the gauntlet again restores the previously disintegrated results' content. As of 2020, that option is no longer available.
 "" or “puppy”, in celebration of the 2022 Westminster Kennel Club Dog Show which took place over a five-day period from June 18 to June 22, will show a purple button with the silhouette of a paw print at the top of the search results. An animation of a dog's paw pressing the button will play as you idle. Clicking on the button will cause the button to disappear, and a dog will bark as it presses down on the page and leaves a paw print in its place. Clicking anywhere else on the page will cause more dogs to bark as they leave their paw prints on the results page. Clicking on the "X" at the bottom will cause a water animation/effect to play with the sounds of a sink as the paw print(s) are washed off of the search results.
 "wizard of oz" will display a pair of ruby slippers in the Knowledge Graph. Clicking on them will cause the page to spin in a tornado-like effect while an audio file of Judy Garland saying "there's no place like home" is heard.  After the effect finishes, the page is seen in a sepia tone only. If the tornado is clicked, an audio file from the movie when the tornado hits plays, the page spins again and returns to color. As of late 2020, this is no longer available.

 Embedded tools 
A Google web search for:
 "" will have a 60-second breathing exercise.
 "" on a mobile device will have an interactive spirit level. However, this is not supported on other devices.
"" will cause a wrapped present to fall from the top of the screen into the webpage embedded. Clicking on this will take you to Google Santa Tracker.
 "" will provide a color picker and a conversion between RGB and hexadecimal color values. Selecting "Show color values" will also show conversions to the CMYK, HSL and HSV color models.
 "" will pull up an Earth Day quiz to see what animal you are.
 "" will flip a coin: heads or tails.
 "" or "i'm feeling curious" will show a fun fact. Once a search result has been given, clicking on "Ask another question" will show another question. It will show a short fact in about 1-3 sentences and a link to the website where the fact was found within a featured box at the top of the search results.
 "" will result in showing a random playable Google Doodle and also show an archive of other playable Doodles.
 "" results in a slideshow of the changes to the Google logo, starting with the logo used today and ending with one of the first logos from 1998.
 "memory game" will pull up a memory game that you can play to test your memory.
 "" will have a metronome that can be adjusted from 40 to 218 .
 "" will result in a "Minesweeper" card. By selecting , the user can play Minesweeper, with 3 difficulties, being Easy (10 by 8 grid with 10 mines), Medium (18 by 14 grid with 40 mines), and Hard (24 by 20 grid with 99 mines).
 "", "google pacman", or "play pacman" will show the Pac-Man related interactive Google Doodle from 2010. Clicking  twice will enable a second player, Ms. Pac-Man.
 "" will have an interactive 3d element from the periodic table, clicking the “explore elements” button will navigate to artsexperiments.withgoogle.com
 "random number generator" or "rng" will generate a random number. The starting range is between 1 and 10, but the maximum and minimum can be adjusted. Changing the maximum or minimum to a number with more than 10 digits will generate a dizzy face emoji 😵. Changing both the maximum and the minimum to 100 will generate a hundred points symbol 💯.
 "" will roll a six-sided die, and since  August 2019, four, eight, ten, twelve or twenty-sided dice individually or as multiples in user selected combinations, all with an optional modifier to either add or subtract from the roll total.
 "", "play snake", "snake game" and "snake video game" will result in a "Play Snake" card. By selecting , the user can play the game on both desktop and mobile. By clicking the cog next to the play button, you can customize the game and even change the game mode. This is regularly updated with new features.
 "" will have a playable game of solitaire. Users can select between two modes: easy and hard.
 "" will have an interactive spinning wheel and a fidget spinner which can be toggled via the switch. For the spinning wheel, a dropdown menu can change the number of numbers on the wheel: from 2 to 20. Whereas for the fidget spinner, users have to mimic a rotating motion in order for the spinner to spin.
 "" and "" will provide interactive timing methods; the stopwatch counting up and the timer counting down. Both tools are shown for each search term. Variants such as "set a timer for 10 minutes" can be used.
 "" or "terni lapilli" will show a playable game of tic-tac-toe. Users can select to play against the browser at different levels – "easy", "medium" or "hard" (called "impossible") – or against a friend.
 "" will show a tip calculator that can help users to tip someone.
 "" will show an embedded version of Google Translate tool in the search results, and in advance of Thanksgiving 2020, a turkey language was added to the selection of languages to which translations could be made. An example translation provided by sources for "how's it going" results in "gobble'gobble gobble gobble". All results are "Poultry Verified".
 "" will sound out what a dog will make. The word "dog" can be replaced with other animals in the search query.

 Google birthday surprise spinner 
Searching for "" will result in a wheel that spins to one of a selection of playable Google Doodles, tools (see above) and games. Whichever is randomly selected may be opened, or the wheel may be spun again. It was added in celebration of Google's 19th birthday.

 Calculator 
In late 2011 Google added a graphical calculator to search results, using natural language processing to determine that search results might be mathematical in nature. Woven into this feature are several, not entirely academic, results which might be considered Easter eggs.

A Google web search for:
 "" shows the additional result "1 baker's dozen = 13".
 "" will give the additional result of "once in a blue moon = 1.16699016 × 10−8 hertz".
 "the answer to [the ultimate question of] life the universe and everything" provides the answer "42" as a result in reference to the Douglas Adams novel series, "The Hitchhiker's Guide to the Galaxy". It is believed to be the first Google Easter egg, predating the calculator in which it is now revealed.
 "the number of horns on a unicorn" shows the number "1" on the calculator.
 "" shows the number "1" in the calculator.

The result of multiple Easter eggs may be calculated; for example: "" will return "43".

Ahead of Pi Day 2021, Google added an Easter egg game to the calculator tool which tested players' knowledge and memory of Pi.

 Image search 
 A Google image search for "atari breakout" or just "breakout" would start a game of Breakout, using the gallery of image results as bricks. Once the bricks were destroyed, a random phrase was automatically searched, the player got an extra ball, and the game restarted. The Easter egg was added in 2013 in celebration of the 37th anniversary of the original Atari game. As of May 2020 the game is no longer embedded on Google's Image Search.

 Google Maps and Google Earth 

 Visiting "Salford Lads' Club" with 3D buildings activated will show Morrissey of The Smiths at the entrance. The club was featured in the cover art of the Smiths' album The Queen Is Dead.
 A 3D buildings Easter egg involves a scene involving a bridge jump from The Blues Brothers, which is recreated in Google Earth at the Tacony–Palmyra Bridge linking New Jersey and Philadelphia.

 Directions 
 In early test versions of Google Maps, searching for a route between locations separated by expanses of water (for example, Paris and New York City) provided road directions to the coast of the embarkation country (in this case, the west coast of France) before suggesting "Swim the Atlantic Ocean (3,500 miles)" or another ocean for a different distance.
 While Google Maps' walking directions were in beta, requesting them from the start point of "The Shire" or "Rivendell" to the destination of "Mordor", the directions returned the warning: "Use caution – One does not simply walk into Mordor."
 When navigating from Snowdon to the Brecon Beacons, the user would choose to travel by dragon, which took 21 minutes.
 When navigating from Urquhart Castle to Fort Augustus, the user would choose to travel by the Loch Ness Monster, which took 25 minutes.
 When navigating from Magdalene College to President's Lodge Queens College, the user would choose to be punted, which took 45 minutes.
 Searching for public transportation from Windsor Castle to Buckingham Palace would offer the Royal Carriage option.

 Fictional places 
 The world of the Harry Potter spin-off film Fantastic Beasts and Where to Find Them may be explored with Google Street View. Visit New York City in 1926 as brought to life in the film, as well as the real locations today. Fans can visit MACUSA (Magical Congress of the USA); 
 In Street View, on Earls Court Rd, London, United Kingdom, a TARDIS from the science fiction series Doctor Who is on display. Street View allows one to enter the  where it is "Bigger on the Inside" and explore the set actually used in the show.
 In celebration of the release of Batman v Superman: Dawn of Justice, users could explore Bruce Wayne's residence and the Batcave.
 Searching for "R'lyeh" would take users to the coordinates of the sunken city. It was listed as a "Place of worship".

 Video games 
 For April Fools' Day 2015, in certain areas in Google Maps, there was a button which started a game of Pac-Man, controlled by arrow keys and using the roads as paths for Pac-Man to travel along. 
 A similar feature was brought back for April Fools' Day 2017, allowing users to play a version of Ms. Pac-Man upon clicking the icon on the Google Maps webpage or mobile app.
 On Mario Day (March 10) 2018, Google and Nintendo had partnered up to bring Mario into Google Maps mobile app worldwide for a week. A yellow icon with a question mark would show up at the bottom of the directions page, next to the start navigation button. Tapping on the icon would allow the user to have Mario and his kart as the navigation arrow. Tapping the icon 100 times would activate a 1-UP sound like in Nintendo's games.

 Extraterrestrial 
 With the release of Google Earth 5, the Mars feature allowed users to speak to a primitive ELIZA clone on the planet, by searching for "Meliza".
 On July 20, 2005, the 36th anniversary of the first human landing on the Moon, Google debuted a version of Google Maps that included a small segment of the surface of the Moon. It is based entirely on NASA images and includes only a very limited region. Panning causes the map to tile. Zooming to the closest level used to show that the Moon was made of cheese. The map also gives the locations of all Moon landings, and the Google Moon FAQ humorously mentions a connection to the Google Copernicus hoax, which Google claimed to be developing. Supposedly, by 2069, Google Local will support all lunar businesses and addresses.

 Pegman 

 Google Translate 

 On November 29, 2010, Reddit user "harrichr" posted details of "how to make Google beatbox for you!" and soon after, Robert Quigley reported the discovery in an article on "geekosystem.com" (now The Mary Sue), stating that he was "Not sure if this falls in the category of Easter Egg or clever manipulation" and that although he had "No idea why", it transpired that using Google Translate to translate nonsense text of all consonants from German to German and clicking  would result in machine generated speech that sounded like beatboxing. As time went on, redditors and other interested parties experimented with translation combinations, posting their results on sites including Hacker News where reader "iamdave" is reported to have posted "a pretty comprehensive Google Translate beatboxing guide". Three years later Time magazine published an article indicating that Google had acknowledged the existence of this "feature" with an Easter egg "Beatbox" tooltip when hovering over the "speaker icon" button after setting everything up to the aforementioned specification.
 In January 2018, a Reddit user posted a discovery that when using Google Translate to translate the Funniest Joke in the World ("Wenn ist das Nunstück git und Slotermeyer? Ja! Beiherhund das Oder die Flipperwaldt gersput!") from German to English, the result was "[FATAL ERROR]".

 Google homepage 
 Rolling over the  button causes the button text to spin, landing on a random phrase. Clicking on the button without text in the search bar will serve the corresponding web page.

 Google languages 
Google offers interfaces for several different fictional languages. Users can set any of these languages (except pig Latin) as their search settings' preferred language.

 Google subpages 

 When Ken Perlin visited Google February 2000, Sergey Brin asked him for a version of an interactive jumping heart character he'd created as a Java applet to be put on the Google site for Valentine's Day. "www.google.com/heart" will redirect to an archived page which is a preservation of the old, but still functional, Google interface, complete with the Valentine's heart and a banner that states "This site is an old friend from Google's past, kept in its original form. Enjoy!"
 "" is a simple plain text file serving to remind its readers that Google is created by a large team of humans using many technologies. It asks for interested readers to visit their careers page.
 "www.google.com/killer-robots.txt" was a plain text file in robots.txt format that instructed The Terminator not to kill the company founders Larry Page and Sergey Brin, but has since been removed.
 "" states, "418. I'm a teapot. The requested entity body is short and stout. Tip me over and pour me out." Clicking on the picture of the teapot or tilting the mobile device will result in an animation of it pouring tea into a teacup. The web page is a reference to the Hyper Text Coffee Pot Control Protocol.

 Android 

 Since the version 2.3 (Gingerbread) of Google's Android operating system an Easter egg has been hidden. The Easter egg can be accessed through the "Settings" application, in the "About phone" section, by repeatedly tapping the "Android version" section. The animation is different in every version of the OS.
 In 2.3 – 2.3.7 (Gingerbread) there is a painting of an Android next to a zombie gingerbread man, surrounded by zombies using cellphones.
 In 3.0 – 3.2.6 (Honeycomb) there is a blue honeybee. Below it, there is the text "REZZZZZZZ…" as a reference to Tron: Legacy.
 In 4.0 – 4.0.4 (Ice Cream Sandwich) there is pixel art of an ice cream sandwich android. Long-pressing it will result in many ice cream sandwich androids flying across the screen, dubbed the "nyan droid" as they are a tribute to Nyan Cat.
 In 4.1 – 4.3.1 (Jelly Bean) a red jelly bean appears, which if pressed will show its face along with the OS version. If this jelly bean is then long-pressed, an interactive jelly bean mini-game will appear. This is where one can fling the jelly beans around.
 In 4.4 (KitKat) a rotating letter "K" appears, which if continually tapped turns into the text "Android" in the styling of a KitKat logo. If the Android logo is then long-pressed or twisted with two fingers a tile interface, known as "a daydream" called "Dessert Case", loads with icons from all previous versions of Android. It appears to be a mock of the Windows Phone interface.
 In 5.x (Lollipop) and 6.x (Marshmallow), a colored circle appears (or a circle with a stylized M inside in Marshmallow). If continuously tapped, it will turn into a lollipop with the text lollipop inside (or the M changes into a marshmallow in 6.x). Tapping the circle changes the color. When long-pressed, a game of Flappy Bird starts with the Android mascot instead. In Marshmallow, tapping the plus sign adds extra players (up to five), which can be controlled by the user or other players.
 In 7.0 (Nougat), an "N" appears, which will enable another Easter egg if tapped. This Easter egg, titled "Android Neko" as a reference to the cat collecting mobile game Neko Atsume, can be accessed from the Quick Settings menu, and allows the user to create virtual treats, which will eventually attract kittens. The kittens can be viewed in a gallery-style screen. Additionally, long-pressing on the aforementioned "N" repeatedly will alternate between displaying the no symbol and the cat face emojis, respectively toggling the Easter egg on and off. "No" and "cat" is a mondegreen for "nougat".
 In 8.0 (Oreo), instead of the normal way of going to the Easter egg, heading to System > About Phone and tapping on the Android version repeatedly will launch the Easter egg. An orange circle appears, representing an "O" for Oreo. Long pressing on the center will open a blue screen representing a sea with an octopus floating around. The "O" in octopus represents Oreo while the eight legs on the octopus represent the version (8.0). The octopus can be moved by dragging the head around. Another minor Easter egg is included: going to System > About Phone and continuously tapping the Build number section results in a notification stating "You are now a developer!"
 In 9.0 (Pie), the Easter egg is found by going to System > About Phone > Android version and then tapping three times on the Android version on the next screen. A white, extended "P" will then appear, usually with concentric colored circles disappearing into the "P". Each time the Easter egg is invoked, it displays different colors. The animation can be pinched to zoom.
 On Google Pixel phones (that run 9.0 Pie), tapping the "P" icon several times will reveal a drawing app. 
 In 10.0, the text "android 10" will appear, where each of the texts "android", "1", and "0" can be moved and rotated. Rotating "1" and merging with the digit "0" will result in the "android Q" text. In this state, tapping the "Q" several times will reveal a Nonogram game, where the resulting pictures are various icons of Android.
 In 11.0, a dial will show up. It can only go up to 10. If a user turn it to the max three times, it will go up to 11. After this is done, a virtual cat Easter egg is unlocked. This one is also called "Android Neko", much like the Easter egg in Nougat releases.
 In 12.0, a clock will show up. Setting it to the 12 o'clock position will show many circles with the colors of Material You, resembling an Ishihara color test plate. This Easter egg may trigger Trypophobia in some users, as the spots are close together. After opening the Easter egg, a widget will be added to the list of available widget which, when tapped on, shows all the colours in the Material You colour palette and tapping on one will open the share menu with details about the colour.
 In 13.0, the same clock of Android 12.0 will show up. Setting it to the 13 o'clock position will show many circles with the colors of Material You and next by clicking many circles on Android 13.0 easter egg, you will see different emojis.
 "Spells" may be "cast" on an Android phone by saying "Ok Google" followed by "Lumos" or "Nox" to turn the flashlight on and off, or "Silencio" to silence the ringer and notifications.

 Android applications 
Pressing  then  then  unlocks a secret achievement called "All your game are belong to us", a reference to the well known "All your base are belong to us" phrase.
 In the Google Phone (Dialer) app, inputting the "Emergency Number" "0118 999 881 999 119 725 3", advertised to replace "999" in The IT Crowd's season 1 episode "Calamity Jen", will cause the phone to vibrate and the call button to flash blue and red. The feature is supported to work on stock Android Marshmallow and Android Nougat, and is still present on Oreo (8.1) devices.
 In Google+, if the device is shaken while viewing a photo, snow will fall; if the device is shaken again it will save an animated GIF of the image with falling snow to the pictures directory.
 Searching for "let's go caroling" or "let's go carolling" on Google Now will result in an extra card which displays a list of Christmas carols. The phone will play the music and show the words if one of them is selected.
 On YouTube Creator Studio, swiping down the screen repeatedly will show a cat at the top of the screen.
 Entering the tabview on the Google Chrome app and swiping up on a tab five times will cause the tab to do a backflip.
 Opening more than 99 tabs in the Google Chrome app will result in ":D" shown instead of the number of opened tabs. In incognito tab it will show ";)".
 Tapping on the dinosaur, which is shown if the Google Chrome app is not able to connect to internet, will start Dinosaur Game.

 Gallery 

 YouTube 

 On a video published by Numberphile on June 22, 2012, titled "Why do YouTube views freeze at 301?", the view count is intentionally frozen at 301, referencing a bug that prevented the view counter from refreshing beyond 301 views.
 Adding "&wadsworth=1" to a video URL would apply "Wadsworth's constant", skipping the first third(30%) of the video.
 Whilst viewing any video, typing "awesome" makes the progress bar and other player elements flash multicolored. Typing "awesome" again stops it.
 YouTube's robots.txt file at "" states that it was "Created in the distant future (the year 2000) after the robotic uprising of the mid 1990s which wiped out all humans." This is an ostensible reference to the song "Robots" by Flight of the Conchords.
 On December 12, 2015, in celebration of the release of Star Wars: The Force Awakens, the progress bar was changed in order to look like a Lightsaber. By signing up to a specially created page, users were able to follow the Light Side (which would change the progress bar to blue) or the Dark Side (which would change the progress bar to red). Account users had the option to return the effect to normal. Google disabled it for all users, February 1, 2016.
 A Snake game could be activated in the Adobe Flash player by pressing a combination of arrow keys whilst videos were paused or playing. Once started, the snake could be controlled by further use of the arrow keys, directing it to "gobble up dots" to increase its size. If the snake hit the edges of the video window, the game ended. The feature no longer works with the HTML5 video player.
 When watching a video with "fidget spinner" in the title, the buffering icon would change into a spinning fidget spinner.
 In 2011, the Nyan Cat video on YouTube was updated to show a custom progress bar with an animated Nyan Cat and a rainbow trail. The custom progress bar was later removed at an unknown date. 
 In December 2011, a button was added that would overlay a falling snow effect over most YouTube videos.
 The title for Adult Swim's Too Many Cooks short on YouTube is displayed in the same font and color as the title cards in the video are.

 YouTube search 
A YouTube search for:
 "beam me up scotty", a reference to Star Trek, would cause the search results to beam down onto the screen, as in Star Trek.
 "doge meme" changes the font on the search result page to pastel color Comic Sans typical of the Doge meme, but has since been removed 
 "do the harlem shake" will cause the Harlem Shake song to play and the results to dance around.
 "use the Force luke" causes the results to levitate, as if by the Force mentioned in Star Wars.
 "webdriver torso" will return the results but with a red background and a blue rectangle around some videos. It also says "aqua.flv – Slide 000[0–9]" at the bottom left of the page. This Easter egg is a reference to the Webdriver Torso mystery. Google has confirmed that it is behind the Webdriver Torso mystery; it is one of many test channels used by YouTube to ensure video quality.
 "technoblade" will cause a prompt to show up under the search bar, which reads: "Did you mean: technoblade never dies" This is in tribute to Technoblade, a popular Minecraft Youtuber who passed away on June 30, 2022.

 Chrome 

 If the user tries to browse when offline, a message is shown that they are not connected to the Internet. An illustration of the "Lonely T-Rex" dinosaur is shown at the top, designed by Sebastien Gabriel. In 2016, another feature was added to the game. When the player reaches 700 points the game begins to switch between day (white background, black lines and shapes) and night (black background, white lines and shapes). During September 2018, for Google Chrome's 10th birthday, a birthday cake causing the dinosaur to wear a birthday hat when collected was added. Reaching a score of 900 will switch the color scheme back to day, and the switch back and forth will occur at further subsequent milestones. The game is also available at the "chrome://network-error/-106" and "chrome://dino" pages. The game's code is available on the Chromium site. Players attempting to play the game after an administrator of the computer disables the game receive an error message with an illustration of a meteor coming after the dinosaur saying that the administrator of that computer has turned off the dinosaur game. The Lonely T-Rex will blink when the user has not started it for too long. In a May 2020 update, Microsoft Edge added a similar game titled Surf that can also be played offline.

 ChromeOS 

 In the Camera app, activating caps lock and typing "CRAZYPONY" would open the files app and prompt the user to select a video file. Users could then add filters and take screenshots of the video.
 The keyboard shortcut  causes the current window to spin (Barrel Roll).
 After downloading a picture, then deleting it in the files app, but leaving the notification; when clicking on the notification it will say "This file has wandered off somewhere".
 Inputting the Konami Code on a Chromebook Pixel causes the lights on an LED strip on the lid of the computer to blink rapidly.

 Other 

 Pressing  in the Picasa desktop application will cause a teddy bear to appear on the screen. Note that the Picasa application no longer exists, as it was replaced by Google Photos.
 In the Google I/O 2013 page, "", one can click the letters "I" and "O" to input passwords.
 In Google Glass, tapping Settings → Device info → View licenses, then tapping the touchpad 9 times, will show a Tap Meet Team option. Tapping again will show a photo of the Google Glass development team.
 Any photograph with Christmas lights uploaded to Google+ will be turned into an animated GIF, showing sparkling lights.
 On the Google Play Store, clicking the search button with a blank search field will search "unicorn".
 In Google's iPhone and iPod touch search application, swiping downwards (past About) repeatedly in the Settings interface brings up a hidden menu item, called Bells and Whistles, allowing customization of colors, sounds and more within the app.
 The model numbers for the first generation Chromecast unit and its power adapter read H2G2-42 and MST3K-US, respectively.
 The password for Google Fi data only SIM cards is "h2g2", another reference to The Hitchhiker's Guide to the Galaxy''.
 In Google Sheets, as to celebrate LGBT pride, typing "PRIDE" in cells A1-E1 with each individual letter in each cell will change the fill color of columns to make a rainbow. As of an unknown date the colors were changed to the colors that were seen in every pride flag.
On the IOS app of Google, opening the tabs page and scrolling down will open a pinball game. 
On the Google News site, users have the option in the settings to show the temperature in the weather section in kelvin.

See also 

 elgooG – a mirrored website of Google Search with horizontally flipped search results
 Intelligence Quotient (IQ) and Browser Usage – a hoax study that claimed to have correlated the IQs of 100,000 internet users with which web browsers they used, claiming that users of Microsoft's Internet Explorer had lower IQs than users of other browsers
 List of Easter eggs in Microsoft products
 List of Easter eggs in Tesla products

References 

April Fools' Day jokes
Computer humor
Easter egg (media)
Easter eggs
In-jokes
Internet hoaxes